Steven Meigs Ford (born May 19, 1956) is an American actor, and son of former U.S. President Gerald Ford and former First Lady Betty Ford.

Early life

Ford is the third child and youngest son of former President Gerald Ford and former First Lady Betty Ford. Ford graduated from T. C. Williams High School in Alexandria, Virginia, on June 13, 1974, at which his father, then Vice President, gave the commencement address. Ford attended Utah State University, studying range management; while his older brother John Gardner (Jack) Ford studied forestry. Ford also attended California State Polytechnic University, Pomona and California Polytechnic State University, San Luis Obispo, where he studied equine studies.

Career
Ford was cast in the film Grease (1978) as Tom Chisum, but dropped out before filming began and was replaced by Lorenzo Lamas, citing stage fright. Ford joined the cast of The Young and the Restless in 1981, creating the role of Private Investigator Andy Richards. He was a regular member of the cast from 1981 to 1987 and briefly from 2002 to 2003. Ford has since appeared in minor roles in a number of films and television series, including Escape From New York, Babylon 5: In the Beginning, Armageddon, Black Hawk Down, Starship Troopers, When Harry Met Sally..., Heat, Contact, Transformers. From 1992 to 1993, he hosted the short-lived series Secret Service.

Personal life
Ford serves on the board of trustees for the Gerald R. Ford Foundation in Grand Rapids, Michigan. He describes himself as a "moderate Republican" and a "fiscal conservative". He also acknowledged that he suffered from alcoholism in the late 1980s and early 1990s. Although he still takes on occasional acting assignments, he spends most of his time raising money for charitable organizations and giving speeches and motivational talks to student groups on alcoholism.

He has never been married. In 1991, he announced his engagement to Laura Carlos. Later, he said that the marriage plans did not go forward as he was working on his sobriety.

On February 14, 1980, he filed a lawsuit in California to determine if he was the legal father of a boy named Lawrence, born on December 16, 1979, to Joy Malken. He also filed for custody and/or visitation rights. There was "a complete and amicable settlement" very shortly afterward, details being kept private.

Filmography

Film

Television

Further reading
Wead, Doug, All the President's Children, Atria Books, New York, 2003,

References

External links

1956 births
American male soap opera actors
American male television actors
California Polytechnic State University alumni
Children of presidents of the United States
Children of vice presidents of the United States
Gerald Ford family
Living people
Male actors from Grand Rapids, Michigan
Utah State University alumni
20th-century American male actors
American male film actors
21st-century American male actors
Michigan Republicans
People from East Grand Rapids, Michigan
T. C. Williams High School alumni